Thomas Spring Rice may refer to:

Thomas Spring Rice, 1st Baron Monteagle of Brandon (1790–1866), British Chancellor of the Exchequer
Thomas Spring Rice, 2nd Baron Monteagle of Brandon (1849–1926), Anglo-Irish peer
Thomas Spring Rice, 3rd Baron Monteagle of Brandon (1883–1934), British diplomat

See also
Thomas Rice (disambiguation)
Thomas Spring (disambiguation)